The Governor of the Department of Atlantico heads the executive branch of the government of the Colombian Department of Atlántico. The governor is the highest-ranking official in the department and is elected by popular vote. The current governor is Elsa Noguera De la Espriella.

Governors

Sources